Azov Lubricants and Oils (AZMOL British Petrochemicals) is a petrochemical company located in Berdiansk, Zaporizhzhia Oblast. Today AZMOL British Petrochemicals is the largest producer of lubricants in Ukraine.

Awards
Order of the Red Banner

See also

XADO
WD-40
Carl Bechem GmbH

References

Companies established in 1937
Recipients of the Order of the Red Banner
Berdiansk
Companies based in Zaporizhzhia Oblast
Petrochemical companies
Petrochemical industry
1937 in Ukraine
History of Zaporizhzhia Oblast